Pandemonium Shadow Show is the second studio album by American singer-songwriter Harry Nilsson, released in December 1967 on RCA Victor.

Background
The album was the first product of Nilsson's three-year, $50,000 recording contract with RCA Victor, and was recorded in their Hollywood studio. Unlike virtually all his earlier records, Show employed the full potential of Nilsson's voice in the recording studio, turning him into what was described as a "chorus of ninety-eight voices".

Nilsson had hoped to use the title Something Wicked This Way Comes, and had asked sci-fi author Ray Bradbury for permission. But approval hadn't come by the release date, so the lesser-known title was chosen (of a circus sideshow appearing in Bradbury's novel) instead.

As well as original songs by Nilsson, a number of covers were included on the album, including  one by Phil Spector (who had earlier co-written a song with Nilsson), Jeff Barry and Ellie Greenwich, "River Deep - Mountain High", and two by The Beatles; "She's Leaving Home" and "You Can't Do That", the latter in an arrangement that quoted lyrics from 17 other Beatles songs. Three other songs were written by Jesse Lee Kincaid, Botkin and Garfield, and Cliff Hess, Howard Johnson and Milton Ager.

The album debuted to little public attention in the US and England, although it was an immediate hit in Canada, where "You Can't Do That" was a top 10 hit. Beatles publicist Derek Taylor heard "1941" on his car radio waiting for his wife at the supermarket and, enjoying the track, ordered a case of copies, sending them out to various industry people he believed would be interested, including The Beatles, who later invited Nilsson to London and helped further his career.

A cover of "1941" by Canadian folk/rock artist Tom Northcott charted in both Canada and the US in 1968.

Fellow musician and earlier collaborator Chip Douglas introduced Nilsson to The Monkees whom he was producing. Nilsson gave an impromptu audition of his latest songs. The Monkees covered two of his songs -"Cuddly Toy" (which appeared on their fourth album),  and later "Daddy's Song" (which appeared on Head) - as well as becoming friends.

"Without Her" was covered by Blood, Sweat and Tears on Child Is Father to the Man and Herb Alpert and the Tijuana Brass on the album Warm.

His early work sold better after Nilsson had become better established through hits like "Without You" and albums like Nilsson Schmilsson. Nilsson revamped several tracks from his first two albums to produce one of the first remix albums, Aerial Pandemonium Ballet, in 1971.

Track listing

Personnel
Harry Nilsson - vocals
Dr. John
Lyle Ritz
Mike Deasy
Milt Holland
George Tipton - arrangements
Perry Botkin Jr. - arrangements on "Freckles" and "It's Been So Long"
Technical
Dick Bogert - engineer
Jeff Gold - photography
Donald Burgess - photography montage

References

Harry Nilsson albums
1967 albums
RCA Victor albums
Albums produced by Rick Jarrard
Albums arranged by George Tipton
Albums arranged by Perry Botkin Jr.